John Grantley Cooper (born 14 May 1954) is a Welsh chess International Master (IM) (1984), ten-times Welsh Chess Championship winner (1976, 1977, 1978, 1984, 1985, 1992, 1993, 1994, 1995, 1996), two-times Chess Olympiad individual silver medal winner (1976, 1984).

Biography
John Grantley Cooper has won ten times in the Welsh Chess Championships: 1976 (jointly), 1977 (jointly), 1978 (jointly), 1984, 1985, 1992, 1993 (jointly), 1994 (jointly), 1995, and 1996. In 1984, he was awarded the FIDE International Master (IM) title.

John Grantley Cooper played for Wales in the Chess Olympiads:
 In 1974, at fourth board in the 21st Chess Olympiad in Nice (+7, =4, -7),
 In 1976, at fourth board in the 22nd Chess Olympiad in Haifa (+5, =3, -2) and won individual silver medal,
 In 1978, at first board in the 23rd Chess Olympiad in Buenos Aires (+6, =2, -5),
 In 1980, at third board in the 24th Chess Olympiad in La Valletta (+5, =4, -4),
 In 1982, at second board in the 25th Chess Olympiad in Lucerne (+6, =2, -3),
 In 1984, at second board in the 26th Chess Olympiad in Thessaloniki (+7, =4, -0) and won individual silver medal,
 In 1986, at first board in the 27th Chess Olympiad in Dubai (+3, =5, -4),
 In 1988, at first board in the 28th Chess Olympiad in Thessaloniki (+5, =3, -5),
 In 1990, at first board in the 29th Chess Olympiad in Novi Sad (+4, =4, -3),
 In 1992, at first board in the 30th Chess Olympiad in Manila (+5, =4, -3).

References

External links

John Grantley Cooper chess games at 365chess.com

1954 births
Living people
Sportspeople from Cardiff
Welsh chess players
Chess International Masters
Chess Olympiad competitors